FKC may refer to:
 Fehérvár KC, a Hungarian handball team
 Fellow of King's College
 Folkestone Central railway station, in England
 Fuze Keeping Clock, a fire control computer